Thompson's Lake State Park is a  state park located near East Berne in Albany County, New York.

Park description
Thompson's Lake State Park offers a beach, a playground and playing fields, picnic tables, recreation programs, a nature trail, fishing and ice fishing, a boat launch, a dump station, campground for tents and trailers, cross-country skiing and snowshoeing. Located within the park boundaries is the Knox District School No. 5, listed on the National Register of Historic Places in 2005.

The park is located within the boundaries of John Boyd Thacher State Park and is adjacent to the Emma Treadwell Thacher Nature Center, which park users also have access to.

See also 
 List of New York state parks

References

External links  
 New York State Parks: Thompson's Lake State Park

State parks of New York (state)
Parks in Albany County, New York